Inape asymmetra is a species of moth of the family Tortricidae. It is found in Ecuador (Azuay Province).

References

External links

Moths described in 2006
Endemic fauna of Ecuador
asymmetra
Moths of South America
Taxa named by Józef Razowski